Liye is a town of Longshan County, Hunan Province, China. Located on the northern bank of You River, Liye is the southernmost town of the county, and bordered to the west by Youshuihe Town and Keda Township of Youyang County, Daxi Township of Xiushan County of Chongqing Municipality, to the south by Qingshuiping and Bier Towns of Baojing County, to the east and southeast by Maoertan Town, to the southwest by Zaguo Township. The present-day Liye was reformed on November 30, 2015.

Culture
Liye is an ancient town with a history of over 2300 years old, it was established by Chu State in the late Warring States period (403 BC - 221 BC). An archaeological site of ancient humans belonging to the Longshan culture (3000 BC - 1900 BC) was found near a bridge in the northeast of the seat of the town in May 1982. Many stone axes, stone chips and red clay pottery were discovered. The Ancient City Ruins of the Warring States period and many precious cultural relics were excavated in the schoolyard of Liye Primary School in April 2002. More than 36,000 pieces of Bamboo Slips of the Qin dynasty in the Ancient City Ruins of Liye were unearthed in June 2002, before the Liye slips were found, there were only about 2,000 slips on the Qin dynasty and fewer than 1,000 words of official Qin records. The event was considered the most important archaeological discovery of the Qin dynasty since the Qin Terracotta Army unearthed in 1973.

Attractions
The town of Liye is  a principal historical and cultural destination in Hunan.

See also 
 List of township-level divisions of Hunan

References 

Longshan County
Towns of Xiangxi Tujia and Miao Autonomous Prefecture
Archaeological sites in China
Tourist attractions in Hunan